Bloom's Lake is a lake in Chisago County, Minnesota, in the United States.

Bloom's Lake was named for Gustaf Bloom, an early Swedish settler.

See also
List of lakes in Minnesota

References

Lakes of Minnesota
Lakes of Chisago County, Minnesota